The Archbishop of Toronto is the head of the Roman Catholic Archdiocese of Toronto, who is responsible for looking after its spiritual and administrative needs.  As the archdiocese is the metropolitan see of the ecclesiastical province encompassing Southern Ontario and part of Northwestern Ontario, the Archbishop of Toronto also administers the bishops who head the suffragan dioceses of Hamilton, London, Saint Catharines, and Thunder Bay.  The current archbishop-elect is Francis Leo.

The archdiocese began as the Diocese of Toronto, which was created on December 17, 1841.  Michael Power was appointed its first bishop, and under his reign, the construction of St. Michael's Cathedral Basilica commenced, with Power himself laying the cornerstone of the new church.  On March 18, 1870, the diocese was elevated to the status of archdiocese by Pope Pius IX while the First Vatican Council was in session.  John Joseph Lynch became the first archbishop of the newly-formed metropolitan see, and received the pallium during his sojourn in Rome to attend the Council.

Ten men have been Archbishop of Toronto; another two were bishop of its predecessor diocese.  Four archbishops – James McGuigan, Gerald Emmett Carter, Aloysius Ambrozic, and Thomas Christopher Collins – were elevated to the College of Cardinals.  Power, the first ordinary of the archdiocese, was also the first English-speaking bishop to be born in Canada.  Denis O'Connor, whose episcopacy spanned from 1899 to 1908, was the first archbishop born in Ontario.  When McGuigan was raised to cardinal in 1946, he became the first anglophone cardinal from Canada, as well as the first cardinal from the Archdiocese.  He also had the longest tenure as Archbishop of Toronto, serving for 36 years from 1934 to 1971, while Fergus McEvay held the position for three years (1908–1911), marking the shortest archepiscopacy.

List of ordinaries

Bishops of Toronto

Archbishops of Toronto

Notes

References
GeneralSpecific

Christianity in Toronto
Toronto
Toronto-related lists